ι Serpentis, Latinized as Iota Serpentis and abbreviated Iot Ser, is a triple star system in the constellation Serpens, in its head (Serpens Caput). It is approximately 190 light years from Earth.

At the centre of the system is a spectroscopic binary, Iota Serpentis A and B.  These are both white main sequence dwarfs and both have apparent magnitudes of +5.3.  This binary has an orbital period variously reported as 11 or 22 years.  First discovered as an astrometric binary, the pair have now been resolved and visual orbits have been derived.

There are two visual companions, Iota Serpentis C, a 13th magnitude star 143 arcseconds away and Iota Serpentis D, a 12th magnitude star 151 arcseconds distant.

References

A-type main-sequence stars
Spectroscopic binaries
Triple star systems
Serpens (constellation)
Serpentis, Iota
Durchmusterung objects
Serpentis, 21
140159
076852
5842